The FA Women's Premier League National Division (originally WFA National League Premier Division) was a football division in England. From 1991 until 2010, the National Division functioned as the top league in English women's football. During its final three seasons, the division operated as the second level of the league pyramid from 2010 to 2013. The division was played on a home and away basis, with each team playing each other twice, and points being awarded in the standard football format.

Below the National Division were simultaneously the Northern and Southern divisions and the remainder of the women's football pyramid.  The terms Women's Premiership and Ladies' Premiership thus generally referred to the National Division alone. The women's National League Premier Division was conceived as the counterpart to the men's football First Division/Premier League.

Founded in 1991 by the Women's Football Association, the league was taken over and renamed "Premier League" in the season 1994–95 by The Football Association. The first title was won by Doncaster Belles in 1991–92. Arsenal hold the most championships, with 12 won between 1993 and 2010.

The National Division lost its top-league status and several teams when the FA introduced the summer competition Women's Super League (WSL) in 2011, with no further promotions. 2012–13 was the final season for the Women's Premier League National Division, with the last championship won by Sunderland, their third in succession. The division was scrapped at the end of the 2012–13 season, prior to the launch of the FA WSL 2 (now the FA Women's Championship).

History

In its first two seasons, the women's National League operated on the pointscoring system of two points for a win, switching to three points for a win in 1993–94.

In the first season, 1991–92, the division contained eight clubs, increasing to 10 clubs in 1992–93.

Premiership teams also competed in the WFA Cup/FA Women's Cup and the Premier League Cup. The first five League champions all won the League and FA Cup Double. From 2000 until 2008, the Premiership winner competed against the FA Cup winner or League runner-up annually for the FA Women's Community Shield. Until 2010, Premiership winners and runners-up competed in the UEFA Women's Cup/Women's Champions League as well.

For the 2006–07 season, the number of competing teams was increased from 10 to 12, with the promotion of the Northern (Blackburn Rovers) and Southern (Cardiff City) champions and no relegations despite test matches being played.

For the National Division's 2010–11 season, the division was reduced to eight clubs from twelve. Six clubs left to form the WSL, as did the Northern Division champions and runners-up, Liverpool and OOH Lincoln. The six remaining National Division clubs and the Southern Division top two, Barnet and Reading, thus comprised the second-level National Division.

List of seasons
As level 1 division:

Note: Bold designates teams that won a double with the Women's FA Cup.† Arsenal won a treble with the UEFA Women's Cup in 2007.

As FA level 2 division:

The Women's Premier League name continued at level 3 in 2013–14 after the National Division was scrapped.

Performance by club

See also
Women's football (soccer)
List of women's football teams
List of women's football (soccer) competitions

External links
The FA Women's Page
femaleSOCCER.net – Girls and women's football including Premier League

References

1
1
Eng

fr:Championnat d'Angleterre de football féminin